Kobayasia is a genus of fungi in the family Phallaceae. It contains the species Kobayasia nipponica  and Kobayasia kunmingica .

It is known as シラタマタケ shiratamatake; "white ball mushroom" in the Japanese language.

The genus name of Kobayasia is in honour of Yosio Kobayasi (1907 - 1993), who was a Japanese botanist (Mycology, Bryology and Algology).

The genus was circumscribed by Sanshi Imai and A. Kawamura in Sci. Rap. Yokohama Natl. Univ., Sect.2, vol.7:
on page 5 in 1958.

References

External links
 Index Fungorum

Phallales
Monotypic Basidiomycota genera